Jeanbouilloniidae is a family of cnidarians belonging to the order Anthoathecata.

Genera:
 Jeanbouillonia Pagès, Flood & Youngbluth, 2006

References

Filifera
Cnidarian families